Madero may refer to:

People
 Abel Sierra Madero (born 1976), Cuban author and scholar
 Adalberto Madero (born 1969), Mexican lawyer and politician
 Alberto Madero (born 1923), Argentine rower
 Eduardo Madero (1823–1894), Argentine merchant, banker and developer
 Emilio Madero (1880–1962), Mexican officer during the Mexican Revolution
 Ernesto Madero (1872–1958), Mexican banker and politician
 Francisco Bernabé Madero (1816–1896), Argentine lawyer and politician
 Francisco I. Madero (1873–1913), Mexican president, writer and revolutionary
 Gustavo A. Madero (1875–1913), participant in the Mexican Revolution against Porfirio Díaz
 Gustavo Madero Muñoz (born 1955), a Mexican politician and businessman
 José Francisco Madero (died 1833), Mexican surveyor and land commissioner
 Miguel Madero (1896–?), Argentine rowing coxswain
 Pablo Emilio Madero (1921–2007), Mexican politician
 Priscilla Madero (born 1976), Ecuadorian swimmer
 Rafael Madero (born 1958), Argentinian rugby union player and coach
 Raúl Madero (born 1939), Argentine footballer and sports physician

Places
 Ciudad Madero, a city in Tamaulipas, Mexico
 Francisco I. Madero, Coahuila, a city in Coahuila, Mexico
 Gustavo A. Madero, Mexico City, a municipality of Mexico City
 Puerto Madero, a district of Buenos Aires, Argentina

See also
 Madero Center, a building in Puerto Madero, Buenos Aires
 Madero Street, a pedestrian street in Mexico City
 Madeira (disambiguation)
 Madera (disambiguation)

Spanish-language surnames